Anita Gara (born 4 March 1983) is a Hungarian chess player. She holds the FIDE titles of International Master (IM) and Woman Grandmaster (WGM). She is six-time Hungarian women's champion (2000, 2001, 2009, 2013, 2016, and 2017). Gara competed in the Women's World Chess Championship in 2018.

Gara has played for the Hungarian team in the Women's Chess Olympiad, Women's World Team Chess Championship, Women's European Team Chess Championship and European Girls U18 Team Chess Championship. She won an individual bronze medal playing on board five in the 2016 Women's Chess Olympiad, held in Baku.

Her sister is Ticia Gara, also a chess player.

References

External links

1983 births
Living people
Chess International Masters
Chess woman grandmasters
Hungarian female chess players
Chess Olympiad competitors
Sportspeople from Budapest